Ceirean, Cirein-cròin or cionarain-crò was a large sea monster in Scottish Gaelic folklore. An old saying claims that it was so large that it fed on seven whales: Local folklores say this huge animal can disguise itself as a small silver fish when fishermen came in contact with it.  Other accounts state the reason for the disguise was to attract its next meal; when the fisherman would catch it in its small silver fish form, once aboard it changed back to the monster and ate him.

A saying goes:

Poem collected by Alexander Carmichael It was taken down in I860, with much more old lore, from Kenneth Morrison, cottar, Trithion, Skye. Kenneth Morrison, old and blind, had much native intelligence and interesting lore. He says he didn't knew what cionaran-cro is unless it be the kracken. According to Alexander Robert Forbes, cionarain-cro is substituted for the cirein-croin in different saying, and ranks second to the "great sea animal".

Forbes identifies the creature as a large sea serpent, but this is arguable. He also proposes it as a dinosaur:

See also
 Jörmungandr - a large sea worm from Nordic mythology
 Stoor worm - a large sea worm from Orcadian folklore

References

 Forbes, Alexander Gaelic names of beasts (mammalia), birds, fishes, insects, reptiles, etc. (1905); available here
  (Cirein-cròin, ceirean)

Scottish Gaelic language
Scottish mythology
Scottish folklore
Mythological aquatic creatures
Sea monsters
Scottish legendary creatures